Amanda Cordner is a Canadian actress, most noted for her regular role as 7ven in the television series Sort Of.

Originally from Schomberg, Ontario, Cordner is a graduate of the theatre program at York University. She first became widely known for stage shows, including Body So Fluorescent and Wring the Roses, co-created with David Di Giovanni through the RISER Project.

She has also had supporting or guest roles in Baroness von Sketch Show, TallBoyz, The Expanse and Station Eleven, a starring role in the web series Slo Pitch, and played the lead role in "The Sender", Cheryl Foggo's contribution to the 21 Black Futures project.

She received a Canadian Screen Award nomination for Best Supporting Performance in a Comedy Series at the 11th Canadian Screen Awards in 2023.

References

External links

21st-century Canadian actresses
21st-century Canadian dramatists and playwrights
Canadian film actresses
Canadian stage actresses
Canadian television actresses
Canadian women dramatists and playwrights
Canadian LGBT dramatists and playwrights
Black Canadian LGBT people
Black Canadian actresses
Canadian LGBT actors
Canadian LGBT writers
Actresses from Toronto
People from King, Ontario
Writers from Toronto
York University alumni
Living people
21st-century Canadian LGBT people